The Sha Tin Public Library is a public library located at 1 Yuen Wo Road, Sha Tin, Hong Kong. It has been managed by the Leisure and Cultural Services Department (LCSD) since 2000.

The library has three public storeys. The first houses administration and the students' study room. The main circulation desk and the children's library are on the second level. The third houses the adult library, reference library and computer laboratory.

History
The library was opened on 16 February 1987 as part of the same complex as the Sha Tin Town Hall, Sha Tin Marriage Registry and a restaurant. It was originally managed by the Regional Council. At that time, it was called the Sha Tin Central Library before its current name was adopted in 2000. Other adjacent buildings in the town centre include New Town Plaza, Shatin Law Courts, Royal Park Hotel, and New Town Tower.

The exterior of the library was refurbished in the early 2000s as the original glass mosaic tiles, as well as the bonding holding them to the building, had deteriorated. Tiles were prone to suddenly fall, and thus posed a public safety risk. The exterior of the library was completely reclad in a reddish ceramic tile, as were the exteriors of the other buildings in the Sha Tin and Tuen Mun town hall complexes built 1986–87.

The interior of the library was renovated from 2007 to 2008. The reading area was revamped and modernised, additional seating was provided in the students' study room, a new reading corner was built in the children's library and audiovisual equipment was enhanced.   Also in 2008, a special "Sports and Fitness Collection" was set up on the third storey. It provides over 18,000 items including books, reports, journals, multimedia, and electronic material.

The LCSD categorises libraries as major, district, or small. Sha Tin Public Library is the only major library in Sha Tin district, and has been assessed as falling short of the prevailing space provision standard for this type of library, as has the district library in nearby Ma On Shan. In order to address this district-wide shortcoming, a new district library was built in nearby Yuen Chau Kok, which opened in 2017.

References

External links

 Sha Tin Public Library

Libraries established in 1987
Library buildings completed in 1987
Public libraries in Hong Kong
Sha Tin
1987 establishments in Hong Kong
Libraries in Hong Kong